The Romanian Raven Shepherd Dog is a livestock guardian dog originating in the southern and sub-Carpathian regions of Argeș County, Brașov County, Dâmbovița County, and Prahova County in Romania. They have been known for generations as "Corbi" because of their black coat. The dog was officially recognized by the Romanian Kennel Club on November 14, 2008.

History
The Romanian Raven Shepherd Dog is a natural breed originating in the Meridional Carpathian and Subcarpathian areal (old Muntenia region of Wallachia, within the Dâmbovița, Argeș and Prahova counties, and around Brașov). These dogs are used as watch dogs for properties and cattle herds.

They are also known as Corbi. The word "corb" means "raven" and the name bespeaks the dog's fur colour, which is a clear black.

Temperament
It is an intelligent, jolly, active dog. It is brave, proud, well-balanced, calm, with a very well developed guard instinct. It is courageous when facing wolves or bears. Its bark is very strong, travelling over great distances. It is submissive, friendly and devoted to its master and family, but doubtful around strangers.

Appearance
The Romanian Raven Shepherd Dog is a large-sized, strong, robust and imposing breed of dog. The head is strong and solid, with a conical, well-developed snout which is shorter than the cambered skull. It has a moderate stop. The eyes are small compared with the rest of the head, almond-shaped and oblique, amber coloured, with strong pigment on the eyelids. The ears are V-shaped, caught higher than the head's level, round-tipped and floppy. The neck is thick and strong.

The body is massive and sturdy, rectangular, rather long, a bit tall and has a strong skeleton with a wide-tall chest. The tail is bushy, covered with long and thick hair. It is caught up, when it is in rest, it is floppy with the tip a bit bent and arrives until the hock's level; in alert it is upped and could surpass the back level. The nails are black or grey. The fur is double, with an underneath coating, short and bushy and an external flat one, harsher and bushier. On the head and the front side of the legs, the fur is short, while on the body it is abundant. The hair on the neck is shaggy and mane-like. The colour is black on at least 80% of the body, possible patches of a clean white may appear on the chest and legs. If overexposed to the sun during summer, the fur acquires scant reddish shades.

See also
 Dogs portal
 List of dog breeds
Guard dog

References 

Dog breeds originating in Romania
Livestock guardian dogs